Angus McLaren (born 3 November 1988) is an Australian actor. He is known for his roles in the television series Packed to the Rafters as Nathan Rafter and H2O: Just Add Water as Lewis McCartney.

Early life
McLaren was born the youngest of three boys, growing up with brothers Rhett and Aidan in Wonthaggi, Victoria, and grew up on a dairy farm near Loch. He attended Mary Mackillop College Leongatha. He was the drummer of the band Rapids (Ballet Imperial) and also played bass guitar in the band Bogey Lowensteins.

Career

2000–2013
He appeared in a number of school and amateur productions for the Leongatha Lyric Theatre. He made his professional debut when he was 12 years old with a recurring role on the ABC series Something in the Air. Further TV credits followed, including the children's series Worst Best Friends, The Saddle Club and Fergus McPhail, along with guest roles on Blue Heelers, Comedy Inc. and a recurring role on Neighbours.

McLaren's first main cast role came in 2004 with the children's series Silversun, which aired on both the Seven Network and the ABC. His feature film debut followed in 2005 with the low budget Melbourne feature Court of Lonely Royals, directed by Rohan Michael Hoole. 2005 also saw McLaren work on Last Man Standing, and achieve a solid footing on the advert voiceover circuit. In 2006, McLaren began working on the children's series H2O: Just Add Water, appearing from series one through midseason of series three as the character Lewis McCartney.

From 2008, he appeared in Packed to the Rafters in the role of Nathan Rafter. He appeared in 102 episodes over the show's six seasons.

2013–present
Through 2013 and into 2014 he took a variety of master classes in New York, LA, Sydney and Melbourne. He then studied a Bachelor of Acting at the Western Australian Academy of Performing Arts in Perth, Western Australia. While at WAAPA, Angus appeared in eight WAAPA stage productions. He was The Marquis De Sade in WAAPA's production of Marat/Sade, The Man in Tender Napalm and, in his graduating year, received great reviews playing the title role in Shakespeare's Coriolanus.

In 2016, he played the character of William "The Crimson Fiddler" Graham in Quartermaine. He won the Nine Network Channel 9 Best Actor Award at the WA Screen Academy Awards for his portrayal of Will in this short film.

In 2018, it was announced that McLaren had joined the cast of Seven Network soap opera Home and Away as recurring character Lance Salisbury during the show's thirty-first season. He made his first appearance in episode 6860, broadcast on 17 April 2018.

Filmography

Films

Television

Theatre

References

External links
 
 
 

1988 births
Australian male child actors
Australian male film actors
Australian male soap opera actors
Living people
People from Wonthaggi
Australian people of Scottish descent
21st-century Australian male actors
Male actors from Victoria (Australia)